Bella Bathurst (born in 1969 in London) is an English writer, photojournalist, and furniture maker. Her novel The Lighthouse Stevensons won the 2000 Somerset Maugham Award.

Biography 
Bathurst was born in London and presently lives in Scotland. She lost "her hearing in her twenties and then unexpectedly regaining it twelve years later," which she explores in her 2017 book Sound.

Aside from writing, Bathurst has worked as a freelance journalist, photographer, and illustrator. Her writing has appeared in such publications as The Guardian, The Independent, The Daily Telegraph, The Observer, The Scotsman, Scotland on Sunday, The Sunday Times, and The Washington Post.

Awards 
The Lighthouse Stevensons won the 2000 Somerset Maugham Award and was nominated for the 1999 Guardian First Book Award. List Magazine named it one of the "100 Best Scottish Books of all time." Booklist and Publishers Weekly gave the book starred reviews.

Special was longlisted for the Orange Prize.

Sound received starred reviews from Shelf Awareness.

Publications 

 The Lighthouse Stevensons (1999)
 Special (2002)
 The Wreckers: A Story of Killing Seas and Plundered Shipwrecks, from the 18th-Century to the Present Day (2005)
 The Bicycle Book (2011)
 The Omega Point: The search for the secret of human consciousness (2015)
 Sound: A Story of Hearing Lost and Found (2017)
 Field Work: What Land Does to People What People Do to Land (2021)

References

External links 

 Official website

1969 births
21st-century English women writers
Writers from London
Living people